The following highways in Virginia have been known as State Route 58:
 State Route 58 (Virginia 1930–1933), now Virginia State Route 94
 U.S. Route 58#Virginia, early 1930s – present